Betty Tackaberry "Tack" Blake (October 29, 1920 – April 9, 2015) was the last surviving member of the first training class (Class 43-W-1 at Sweetwater, Texas, on April 24, 1943) of the Women Airforce Service Pilots paramilitary aviation service. The WASPS flew aircraft ferrying/delivery missions, towed aerial targets, and some even participated in flight testing and evaluation of advanced jet and rocket-powered aircraft. In performing these missions, the woman effectively replaced male pilots, who could be utilized in combat roles.

Biography 
Betty Guild earned her pilots license through the Civilian Pilot Training Program at the University of Hawaii. She was a civilian inter-island tour/ferry pilot in Hawaii in 1941.

Betty witnessed the 7 December Japanese Imperial Navy sneak attack on Pearl Harbor from her family's home overlooking the harbor. She had been scheduled to fly that morning, but her passenger had cancelled the day before. Betty's fiancé, Robert Tackaberry, was a naval officer assigned to the USS California (BB-44), but was with Betty at the time it was sunk.

A few months after the Pearl Harbor attack, Betty was recruited by Jackie Cochran into the effort to form the WASPs. Betty was initially turned down for training because of lack of flying hours. During her service, Betty flew all types of fighters, bombers, and other aircraft from factories to the East Coast for trans-Atlantic delivery, 36 types of aircraft in all. Betty proclaimed her favorite of all these aircraft was the North American P-51 Mustang.

After the war, Betty divorced Robert Tackaberry. She subsequently married US Air Force pilot George Blake. They moved to, and built the first house in Paradise Valley, Arizona, and had three sons who all became pilots.

Betty's book, "High on Life; Rebel, WASP," was supposed to have been published in December 2007.

References

External links
 

1920 births
2015 deaths
Women Airforce Service Pilots personnel
People from Honolulu
Place of birth missing
21st-century American women